Silvio Giobellina (born 28 February 1954) is a Swiss bobsledder who competed during the early to mid-1980s. He won a bronze medal in the four-man event at the 1984 Winter Olympics in Sarajevo.

Giobellina also won two medals in the four-man event at the FIBT World Championships with a gold in 1982 and a bronze in 1985.

References
 Bobsleigh four-man Olympic medalists for 1924, 1932-56, and since 1964
 Bobsleigh four-man world championship medalists since 1930
 DatabaseOlympics.com profile

1954 births
Bobsledders at the 1984 Winter Olympics
Living people
Swiss male bobsledders
Olympic bobsledders of Switzerland
Olympic bronze medalists for Switzerland
Olympic medalists in bobsleigh
Medalists at the 1984 Winter Olympics
20th-century Swiss people